Stypocladius is a genus of flies in the family Neriidae.

Distribution
Taiwan, Japan.

Species
Stypocladius appendiculatus (Hendel, 1913)

References

Brachycera genera
Neriidae
Taxa named by Günther Enderlein
Diptera of Asia